Helicopter Maritime Strike Four Six (HSM-46), the "Grandmasters", are a United States Navy helicopter squadron based at Naval Air Station Jacksonville, Florida.  HSM-46 deploys aboard cruisers, destroyers, and aircraft carriers in independent operations or in support of strike groups. The squadron was established on 7 April 1988 as Helicopter Antisubmarine Squadron (Light) Forty Six (HSL-46)

Mission and history
HSM-46 deploys Light Airborne Multi-Purpose System (LAMPS) program helicopters to United States Navy warships performing search and rescue, vertical replenishment, medical evacuation, and communications relay and combat missions. Established at Mayport, Florida, on April 7, 1988, HSM-46 currently deploys ten detachments aboard Atlantic Fleet ships. A detachment normally consists of one or two aircraft, five to six pilots, two to three sensor operators, a maintenance chief, and eight to twelve maintenance personnel. A typical detachment deploys with its assigned ship for six months, with several shorter work-up cruises prior to the long deployment. The squadron is directly responsible to Commander, Helicopter Maritime Strike Wing, U.S. Atlantic Fleet.

The squadron is currently assigned to Carrier Air Wing 7 on board the aircraft carrier , replacing HSM-79.

Transition from HSL-46
HSL-46 was re-designated HSM-46 in March 2012 at Naval Station Mayport.

See also 
 History of the United States Navy
 US Navy Helicopter Squadrons
 MH-60R

References

Helicopter maritime strike squadrons of the United States Navy
Military units and formations in Florida